Franklin Richards may refer to:

Franklin D. Richards (Mormon apostle) (1821–1899), LDS Church apostle
Franklin S. Richards (1849–1934), general counsel for the LDS Church in the late 19th century
Franklin D. Richards (Mormon seventy) (1900–1987), former head of the U.S. Federal Housing Administration and a leader in the LDS Church
Franklin Richards (comics), fictional Marvel Comics character, son of Reed Richards and Susan Storm

See also
Frank Richards (disambiguation)